Southgate station is an Edmonton Light Rail Transit station in Edmonton, Alberta. It is served by the Capital Line. It is a ground-level station located next to the Southgate Centre shopping mall and the Southgate Transit Centre at 51 Avenue and 111 Street.

The station was officially opened on April 24, 2010, with regular service commencing on April 25, 2010.

Southgate LRT Station provides an important transit connection between southwest Edmonton neighbourhoods, the University of Alberta and downtown Edmonton.

Station layout
The station has a 123-metre long centre-loading platform that can accommodate two trains at the same time, one on each side of the platform. The platform is exactly nine metres wide.  It also has a grade-separated pedestrian overpass connecting the station to Southgate Centre and the Southgate Transit Centre to the east and the Malmo Plains neighbourhood to the west.The transit centre features two  brick boots, titled Immense Mode, a public art piece by Dawn Detarando and Bryan McArthur.

Around the station
Southgate Centre
Empire Park
Harry Ainlay Composite High School
Lendrum Place
Malmo Plains
Pleasantview

Southgate Transit Centre

The Southgate Transit Centre, first opened on November 22, 1977, is located on the east side of 111 Street, adjacent to the LRT Station. It is connected to the station by an elevator-equipped pedestrian overpass which also crosses to the west side of 111 Street and the Malmo Plains neighbourhood. This transit centre has a drop off area, a large shelter and a pay phone. It does not have park & ride, public washrooms or vending machines. There are public washrooms available in the adjacent LRT station.

The transit centre temporarily moved to the north side of 51 Avenue on 111 Street for 2007 and 2008, during the construction of the Southgate LRT station.

The following bus routes serve the transit centre:

The above list does not include LRT services from the adjacent LRT station.

References

External links

Edmonton Light Rail Transit stations
Railway stations in Canada opened in 2010
Edmonton Transit Service transit centres
Capital Line